Anne Roselle (born Gyenge Anna, 20 March 1894 – 31 July 1989) was a Hungarian-American opera singer.

Early life 
Gyenge Anna was born in Târgu Secuiesc (Kézdivásárhely), that time Hungary, now Romania, part of the city's large population of Székely Hungarians. (Some sources give her birthplace as Budapest.) She completed her studies in Csíkszereda (Miercurea Ciuc), Székelyudvarhely (Târgu Secuiesc) and Kolozsvár (Cluj-Napoca). She debuted in Budapest as Iluska in Pongrác Kacsó's "János Vitéz". In 1912, she married the banker Árpád Rosner in Temesvár (Timisoara), and they together moved to the US in this year, with her mother and stepfather. Roselle acted in Budapest and studied acting with Szidi Rákosi as a young woman. She studied singing with Estelle Liebling in New York City.

Career 
Roselle sang in New York, with the Metropolitan Opera in 1920, as Musetta in La bohème. She debuted on December 4, 1920, on the side of Frances Alda, Beniamino Gigli (his third performance in MET), Antonio Scotti and Adamo Didur. From 1922, she sang for two years with the San Carlo Opera Company, was a guest soloist with the Minneapolis Orchestra, toured in the central United States in the 1922-1923 season, and the private company of Antonio Scotti  then moved back to Europe. She joined the Dresden Opera in 1925 to sing the title role in the first German performance of Puccinis's Turandot on the side of Richard Tauber and conducted by Fritz Busch (July 4, 1926). She premiered the first Turandot in the US outside the MET in San Francisco (1927) and next year, the first performance in Verona with Georges Thill (1928).  She sang in Budapest, Milan, Vienna, London, Paris and Berlin, and was part of a radio broadcast of Verdi's Un ballo in maschera, with Maria Olszewska.  She was also known for singing the title role in Verdi's Aïda and Leonora in Il trovatore, among others.

Roselle returned to the United States late in 1929, and sang at Carnegie Hall. The New York Times reported that "her higher tones are usually produced with fine resonance and color and absolute fidelity to the pitch". In 1931, she starred in the first United States performance of Wozzeck, with the Philadelphia Orchestra, under the direction of Leopold Stokowski, and in the MET, as her last appearance there. Also in 1931, she performed the first German-language version in America of Richard Strauss's Elektra in the US, conducted by Fritz Reiner, casting also Margarete Matzenauer, Charlotte Boerner and Nelson Eddy.

She regularly sang in Budapest between 1926-1938, where she was a company member in 1936/1937. Her roles covered a rarely seen repertoire from Mozart's Constanze to Turandot, and also Nedda and Santuzza (after each other), Butterfly, Margit (Faust), Tosca, Leonore (Il Trovatore), Elisabeth (Tannhäuser), Saffi (Der Zigeunerbaron), Mimi, Desdemona and Donna Anna. In 1936, she went to a tour to her native land Transilvania with a selection of Kodály's Hungarian Folk Songs, and toured to Hungarian cities like Szeged, Miskolc, Nagykanizsa, Debrecen. In 1935, she got a role in the film 'Halló, Budapest'.

In 1934, she was back at Carnegie Hall, in Orfeo ed Euridice. and went to London to sing Turandot  with her partners Eide Norena, Armand Tokatyan and Ezio Pinza.

Her possible last appearance on a staged full opera was in 1941, in Mozarts Don Giovanni, with her partners Ezio Pinza, Tito Schipa, Margit Bokor, Lőrincz Alváry, conducted by László Halász. There is a 35 minute long recording of this performance. Until 1946, she sang arias at various concerts, too.

In 1946, she sang in a diverse 'pop' concert at Carnegie Hall, sharing the program with Hungarian pianist Ernö Balogh, Huddie Ledbetter, Mary Lou Williams, Tom Scott, Susan Reed, and others. She gave a recital in 1948 at New York's Town Hall performance space. She recorded opera arias and songs by Schubert and Hungarian composers to 26 LP discs.

After she retired from the stage, Roselle taught voice in Philadelphia. She was artist-in-residence at Florida Southern College in her later years, until she retired from teaching in 1967.

Roselle made several recordings in Berlin in the 1920s. In 1934, she gave an interview decrying the effect of recorded music on live music. In 1971, she gave another interview, grateful to revisit the past through recordings.

Anne Roselle made her first recordings under her birthname Anna Gyenge for Victor (Camden 1916-17), then followed records for Polydor (Berlin 1926-28 and Paris 1932). In 1948 she recorded in New York for Continental and Remington.

 Personal life 
In 1912, Roselle married a Hungarian banker, Árpád (later David in America) Rosner; they had a son, George. She was widowed when Rosner died in 1956; she lived in a nursing home in Lakeland, Florida in her later years. She died in 1989, aged 95 years.

 References 

 Literature 
Jim McPherson: Anne Roselle in "The Record Collector Vol. 47 No.4, December 2002

 External links 

 "Anne Roselle (Soprano)" Forgotten Opera Singers'' (June 11, 2016). A blog post about Roselle.
 Anne Roselle signing Turandot, on a 1926 recording; on YouTube.

1894 births
1989 deaths
20th-century Hungarian women opera singers
Székely people
Naturalized citizens of the United States
Hungarian emigrants to the United States